Heald Green is an electoral ward in the Metropolitan Borough of Stockport. It elects three Councillors to Stockport Metropolitan Borough Council using the first past the post electoral method, electing each Councillor for a three-year term with no election every fourth year.

The ward is in the south-west of Stockport and has a railway station with services to Manchester and Manchester Airport.

All three seats are currently held by independents representing the Heald Green and Long Lane Ratepayers Association.

Councillors
Heald Green electoral ward is represented in Westminster by Mary Robinson MP for Cheadle.

The ward is represented on Stockport Council by three councillors: Catherine Stuart (Independent); Carole McCann (Independent); and Anna Charles-Jones (Independent).

 indicates seat up for re-election.

Elections in the 2010s

May 2021

May 2019

May 2018

May 2016

May 2015

May 2014

May 2012

May 2011

References

External links
Stockport Metropolitan Borough Council

Wards of the Metropolitan Borough of Stockport